Charlottetown-West Royalty is a provincial electoral district for the Legislative Assembly of Prince Edward Island, Canada. It was created prior to the 2019 election from parts of the former districts Charlottetown-Lewis Point and West Royalty-Springvale.

The riding is located in the city of Charlottetown, including the neighbourhoods of Lewis Point and West Royalty.

Members

Election results

Charlottetown-West Royalty, 2019–present

Referendum and plebiscite results

2019 electoral reform referendum
The 2019 Prince Edward Island electoral reform referendum was held on April 23, 2019.

References

External links
Elections PEI: District 14 Charlottetown-West Royalty

Politics of Charlottetown
Prince Edward Island provincial electoral districts